Manipur Technical University is a state university located in Imphal, Manipur, India. The first state university in Manipur, it was established through the Manipur Technical University Act, 2016 on 23 April 2016, and was formally inaugurated by the Governor of Manipur, V. Shanmuganathan on 5 August 2016.

The university offers B.Tech. courses in Civil Engineering, Mechanical Engineering, Electrical Engineering, Electronics Engineering and Computer Science Engineering.

Departments 

 Civil Engineering
 Computer Science Engineering
 Chemistry
 Electrical Engineering
 Electronics & Communication Engineering
 Humanities & Social Science
 Management
 Mathematics
 Mechanical Engineering
 Physics

References

External links
 

Universities in Manipur
Education in Imphal
2016 establishments in Manipur
Educational institutions established in 2016
State universities in India